Ahmed Fakhry (born in Faiyum Governorate in 1905 – 1973) was an Egyptian archaeologist who worked in the Western desert of Egypt (including in 1940 dig at El Haiz, and then at Siwa), and also in the necropolis at Dahshur.

References

Bibliography
 Siwa Oasis, Cairo, Egypt, American University in Cairo Press 1990
 Bahriyah and Farafra, Cairo, American University in Cairo Press 2003
 An archaeological journey to Yemen, (March–May, 1947)
 Bahria Oasis
 The Bent pyramid of Dahshûr / by Ahmed Fakhry ; with papers by Hasan Mostafa and Herbert Ricke
 Intiṣār al-ḥaḍārah : tārīkh al-Sharq al-qadīm / bi-qalam Zhayms Hanrī Baristid ; naqalahu ilá al-ʻArabīyah Aḥmad Fakhrī
 The Inscriptions of the Amethyst Quarries at Wadi el Hudi
 The monuments of Sneferu at Dahshur
 The Oases of Egypt
 The Oasis of Siwa  its customs, history and monuments
 Sept tombeaux a l'est de la Grande Pyramide de Guizeh

1905 births
1973 deaths
Egyptian Egyptologists
Egyptian archaeologists
People from Faiyum Governorate
20th-century archaeologists